The Huanghai Plutus (大柴神) is a pickup truck produced and sold by Chinese automobile manufacturer SG Automotive under the Huanghai Auto marque since 2007. The first generation sold from 2007 to 2012 is a compact pickup truck, while the second generation model sold from 2012 has grown to the midsize pickup segment. The second generation model shares the platform with the Huanghai Landscape F1 SUV.



First generation

The double-cab first generation Huanghai Plutus is available in 4X4 and 4X2 models, and is powered by an Isuzu-derived 4JB1T 2,771 cc diesel turbo engine that makes 100 hp and 230 Nm of torque at 2,200 rpm.

No automatic transmission was available for the Huanghai Plutus and the sole transmission option is a five-speed manual.

A variant called the Huanghai Steed (Aojun, 傲骏) is also available featuring a restyled front fascia.

Markets

Malaysia
The standard Huanghai Plutus model in Malaysia includes ABS, EBD, driver’s airbag, MP3/CD player, fog lamps, power windows, electric wing mirrors and reverse sensor. The first generation Plutus is priced at RM61,923.60 for the 4X2 and RM70,923.60 for the 4X4 model. The warranty is at just two years or 60,000 km.

Vietnam
The PMC Premio Max is the Huanghai Plutus Classic sold in Vietnam with different badging. The truck was assembled in Vietnam by Mekong Auto, a joint venture between the Unification Church and North Korea.

Uruguay and Brazil
The Huanghai Plutus was also sold as the Effa Plutus by Effa Motors in Uruguay and Brazil.

Styling controversies
Styling of the pre-facelift first generation Huanghai Plutus has been controversial as the exterior design is heavily resembling the first generation Chevrolet Colorado. The post-facelift first generation model has a revised front end that resembles the Toyota Land Cruiser Prado instead.

Second generation

The second generation Huanghai Plutus (大柴神) is essentially the pickup version of the Huanghai Landscape F1 SUV, sharing the same platform and same front fascia design. It was launched in May 2012.

Powertrain
The second generation Plutus is available with a 2.4 liter gasoline engine and a 3.2 liter turbo diesel engine. The 3.2 liter inline-4 turbo diesel engine is supplied by FAW Dachai and produces a maximum power of 107 hp（79 kW）at 3200rpm and a maximum torque of 245N·m at 2000rpm.

Styling controversy
Styling of the second generation Huanghai Plutus has been controversial as the exterior cab design is heavily resembling the first generation Kia Sorento.

References

External links
 Huanghai website

2000s cars
Pickup trucks
Cars introduced in 2007
Trucks of China
Rear-wheel-drive vehicles
All-wheel-drive vehicles